Lions At The Gate is an American heavy metal band consisting of former Ill Niño members Diego Verduzco (guitar), Cristian Machado (vocals), and Ahrue Luster (guitar), together with Stephen Brewer (bass), and Fern Lemus (drums).

Since their formation, the band released 5 singles. The most recent, Find My Way, features guest vocals by Tatiana Shmailyuk of Jinjer, was released in April 2022.

History
Lions At The Gate was formed in 2021 by vocalist Cristian Machado, guitarists Ahrue Luster and Diego Verduzco. All three members left Ill Niño in 2019. They later recruited Westfield Massacre bassist Stephen Brewer and drummer Fern Lemus. Their first single, Not Even Human was released on June 4, 2021.

Band members

Current
 Cristian Machado – vocals (2021–present)
 Diego Verduzco – rhythm guitar (2021–present)
 Ahrue Luster – lead guitar (2021–present)
 Stephen Brewer – bass (2021–present)
 Fern Lemus – drums, percussion (2021–present)

Discography 
Singles

Music videos

External links

References 

American heavy metal musical groups